The Peoria Center for the Performing Arts is a 250-seat theater in Peoria, Arizona. It opened in December 2006 and is operated by the acting company Theater Works

Received Best New Playhouse in 2008 by Phoenix New Times. 
Best New Playhouse.

Designed by Westlake Reed Leskosky. Architectural Record
Peoria Center for the Performing Arts.

References

External links 
 Theater Works
 Peoria Arts Commission

Theatres in Arizona
Culture of Peoria, Arizona
Performing arts centers in Arizona
Buildings and structures in Maricopa County, Arizona
Tourist attractions in Maricopa County, Arizona
Theatres completed in 2007
Buildings and structures in Peoria, Arizona